Pseudodinia antennalis is a species of fly in the family Chamaemyiidae.

References

Chamaemyiidae
Articles created by Qbugbot
Insects described in 1940
Taxa named by John Russell Malloch